The Little Flowers of St. Francis is a florilegium (excerpts of his body of work), divided into 53 short chapters, on the life of Saint Francis of Assisi that was composed at the end of the 14th century. The anonymous Italian text, almost certainly by a Tuscan author, is a version of the Latin Actus beati Francisci et sociorum eius, of which the earliest extant manuscript is one of 1390 AD. Luke Wadding ascribes the text to Father Ugolino da Santa Maria, whose name occurs three times in the Actus. Most scholars are now agreed that the author was Ugolino Brunforte ( – c. 1348).

History
Little Flowers of Francis of Assisi is the name given to the classic collection of popular legends about the life of St. Francis of Assisi and his early companions. The collection, one of the most delightful literary works of the Middle Ages, was translated into Italian by an unknown fourteenth-century friar from a larger Latin work, the "Actus B. Francisci et Sociorum Ejus", attributed to Ugolino Brunforte. Or rather the fifty-three chapters which form the true text of the Fioretti were; the four appendixes (on the Stigmata of St. Francis, the life of Fra Ginepro, and the life and the sayings of the Fra Egidio) are additions of later compilers.

A striking difference is noticeable between the earlier chapters of the "Fioretti", which refer to St. Francis and his companions, and the later ones, which deal with the friars in the province of the March of Ancona. The first half of the collection reflects traditions that go back to the early days of the order; the other is believed to be substantially the work of Fra Ugolino da Monte Giorgio of the noble family of Brunforte.

Living as he did a century after the death of St. Francis, Ugolino was dependent on hearsay for much of his information; part of it he is said to have learned from Fra Giacomo da Massa, who had been well known and esteemed by the companions of the saint. Whatever may have been the sources from which Ugolino derived his materials, the fifty-three chapters that constitute the Latin work in question seem to have been written before 1328.

Stories 
Written a century and a half after the death of Francis of Assisi, the text is not regarded as an important primary source for the saint's biography. However, it has been the most popular account of his life and relates many colourful anecdotes, miracles and pious examples from the lives of Francis and his followers (such as Brother Juniper). These poetic stories shed much light upon the genesis and development of the following of Saint Francis.

Some stories contained in the Fioretti can be found in much earlier works. Fioretti di San Francesco, Chapter 13: Preaching to the Birds relates that Francis, Friar Masseo and Friar Agnolo traveled to and preached at a city called Saburniano (Cannara). Those that heard them were so inflamed by their message that they desired to leave the city and follow these friars into the wilderness. Francis told them that such a thing was not necessary, but instead he established the Third Order "for the universal salvation of all people". Francis had already been concerned about the expansion of his order at the expense of families. He refused entrance to his order by married men (and the women from admission to the Poor Clares) who sought to follow the Franciscan way, because families should not suffer. Francis preaching to the birds was described by Fra Masseo, and written of by the Englishman Roger of Wendover, in 1236.

The vernacular version is written in Tuscan and is reckoned among the masterpieces of Italian literature. Arthur Livingstone, author of a 1930s edition of the Little Flowers, characterizes it as "a masterful work of folk literature from the Middle Ages".

The earliest manuscript is dated 1390, and is in Berlin. The Italian translation was first printed at Vicenza in 1477.

In popular culture
The text was the inspiration for the Roberto Rossellini's 1950 film Francesco, giullare di Dio (Francis, God's Jester), which was co-written by Federico Fellini. It was also used as a source for the libretto of Olivier Messiaen's opera Saint-François d'Assise.

See also
 Ugolino Brunforte

References

eBook
 Francis of Assisi, The Little Flowers (fioretti), London, 2012. limovia.net

External links
The text in English at Christian Classics Ethereal Library
The text, in Italian, is available in plain text and/or rtf format from the Liber Liber: biblioteca e audioteca digitali ad accesso gratuito site, which also provides a brief description of the text.

14th-century books
14th-century Christian texts
Francis of Assisi